Major Lionel Gough Arbuthnot, MBE was a banker and soldier who also played first-class cricket on a tour of the West Indies in 1901–02.

Cricket career
Arbuthnot was not part of the official touring party which had just 11 players, but appeared in seven of the 13 first-class matches, including two of the games against teams representing the combined West Indies. He batted at No 11 in all but one of his seven games and he did not bowl.

His best match, and that of the whole team, was the second of the "international" fixtures he played in against the West Indies at Georgetown, Guyana, when he made his top score of 17 not out and shared in a 10th wicket partnership of 43 with wicketkeeper Arthur Whatman, who was captaining the side in Bennett's absence. The touring team won the match by an innings and 330 runs.

Military career
Captain, Lancashire Fusiliers; MBE 3 June 1919; Temp Lt Lanc Fus transferred to General List ADC 10 Jun 1918. Temp Major Labour Corps to be temp Lt-Col while employed as Army Burial Officer 23 Dec 1918. He relinquished his commission (temp Capt, ADC personal staff, general list) and was appointed temp Lt 23 Jan 1919. He relinquished his commission (temp Major, Capt ret'd pay) and retains the rank of Major 20 Jun 1919. He relinquished his commission (temp Lt, 4th Bn Sussex Reg't) 5 July 1921. Brigadier-General, Royal Fusiliers. Order of the White Eagle (Serbia) 5th class.

External links
Cricket-online

References

English cricketers
Lionel
1867 births
1942 deaths
People educated at Harrow School
Members of the Order of the British Empire
Lancashire Fusiliers officers
British Army personnel of World War I